Mario Giubertoni (born 8 December 1945 in Moglia) is a retired Italian professional footballer who played as a defender.

Honours
Inter
 Serie A champion: 1970–71.

1945 births
Living people
Italian footballers
Serie A players
Palermo F.C. players
Inter Milan players
Hellas Verona F.C. players
Association football defenders
Footballers from Lombardy